Le Club des 100 Watts was a youth TV show aired on Radio-Québec (now Télé-Québec) from 1988 to 1994. It was hosted by Marc-André Coallier. It also featured Quebec celebrities such as Marc Labrèche, Guylaine Tremblay, and Claude Legault

Television shows filmed in Quebec
1980s Canadian children's television series
Télé-Québec original programming
1990s Canadian children's television series